The Maronites are a Christian ethnoreligious group native to the Eastern Mediterranean and Levant region of the Middle East, whose members traditionally belong to the Maronite Church, with the largest concentration long residing near Mount Lebanon in modern Lebanon. The Maronite Church is an Eastern Catholic  particular church in full communion with the Pope and the rest of the Catholic Church, whose membership also includes non-ethnic Maronites.

The Maronites derive their name from the Syriac Christian saint Maron, some of whose followers migrated to the area of Mount Lebanon from their previous place of residence around the area of Antioch, and established the nucleus of the Antiochene Syriac Maronite Church. Christianity in Lebanon has a long and continuous history. Biblical scriptures state that Peter and Paul evangelized the Phoenicians, whom they affiliated to the ancient patriarchate of Antioch. The spread of Christianity in Lebanon was very slow where paganism persisted, especially in the mountaintop strongholds of Mount Lebanon. Saint Maron sent Abraham of Cyrrhus, often referred to as the Apostle of Lebanon, to convert the still significant pagan population of Lebanon to Christianity. The area's inhabitants renamed the Adonis River the Abraham River after Saint Abraham preached there.

The early Maronites were Hellenized Semites, natives of Byzantine Syria who spoke Greek and Syriac, yet identified with the Greek-speaking populace of Constantinople and Antioch. They were able to maintain an independent status in Mount Lebanon and its coastline after the Muslim conquest of the Levant, keeping their Christian religion, and even the distinctive Western Aramaic language as late as the 19th century. Some Maronites argue that they are of Mardaite ancestry, and other historians such as the Clement Joseph, Syriac Catholic Archbishop of Damascus, David reject the identification of Maronites with the Mandates.

Mass emigration to the Americas at the outset of the 20th century, famine during World War I that killed an estimated one third to one half of the population, the 1860 Mount Lebanon civil war and the Lebanese Civil War between 1975-90 greatly decreased their numbers in the Levant; however Maronites today form more than one quarter of the total population of modern-day Lebanon. Though concentrated in Lebanon, Maronites also show presence in the neighboring Levant, as well as a significant part in the Lebanese diaspora in the Americas, Europe, Australia, and Africa.

The Antiochene Syriac Maronite Church, under the Patriarch of Antioch, has branches in nearly all countries where Maronite Christian communities live, in both the Levant and the Lebanese diaspora.

The Maronites and the Druze founded modern Lebanon in Ottoman Lebanon in the early 18th century, through the ruling and social system known as the "Maronite-Druze dualism" in the Ottoman Mount Lebanon Mutasarrifate. All Lebanese presidents, with the exception of Charles Debbas and Petro Trad, have been Maronites as part of a continued tradition of the National Pact, by which the Prime Minister has historically been a Sunni Muslim and the Speaker of the National Assembly has historically been a Shi'ite.

Etymology 
Maronites derive their name from Maron, a 4th-century Syriac Christian saint venerated by multiple Christian traditions. He is often mistaken with John Maron, the first Maronite Patriarch, who ruled 685-707.

History

The cultural and linguistic heritage of the Lebanese people is a blend of both indigenous Phoenician elements and the foreign cultures that have come to rule the land and its people over the course of thousands of years. In a 2013 interview, Pierre Zalloua, a Lebanese biologist who took part in the National Geographic Society's Genographic Project, pointed out that genetic variation preceded religious variation and divisions: "Lebanon already had well-differentiated communities with their own genetic peculiarities, but not significant differences, and religions came as layers of paint on top. There is no distinct pattern that shows that one community carries significantly more Phoenician than another."

Although Christianity existed in Roman Phoenice since the time of the Apostles, Christians were a minority among the majority pagans by the time Emperor Theodosius I issued The Edict of Thessalonica in 380 AD. The coastal cities of Tyre and Sidon remained prosperous during Roman rule, but Phoenicia had ceased to be the maritime empire it once was centuries ago and the north of Berytus (Beirut) and the mountains of Lebanon concentrated a big part of the intellectual and religious activities. Very few Roman temples in Phoenicia were built in the coastal cities, hence the reason for the reign of paganism in the interior of the land.

The Maronite movement reached Lebanon when in 402 AD Saint Maron's first disciple, Abraham of Cyrrhus, who was called the Apostle of Lebanon, realized that there were many non-Christians in Lebanon and so he set out to convert the Phoenician inhabitants of the coastal lines and mountains of Lebanon, introducing them to the way of Saint Maron. Many Phoenician pagans became Maronite Christians.

In 451 AD, the Maronites followed the Council of Chalcedon, rejecting miaphysitisim and maintaining full communion with the then united Orthodox Catholic Church. In 517 AD, a conflict between the Maronites and the Miaphysite Jacobite Syriacs caused the massacre of 350 Maronite monks.

Escaping persecution following the Muslim conquest of the Levant in 637 AD, the Maronites living in the low lands and coastal cities confined themselves to the Mount Lebanon and to the coastal cities of the Phoenician coast which did not particularly interest the Arabs; the area consisting of those regions extending from Sidon in the South and up to Batroun and the south of Tripoli in the north. The Arab conquerors settled in various cities of the Phoenician coast to reduce Byzantine interference even though they were not interested in maritime trade. Since the mountains offered no attraction to them, the Maronites continued to find refuge from colonial empires in the Mountains of Lebanon, especially Qadisha Valley.

The Maronites raided the newly Arab towns after the conquest of 637 AD and were later joined by the Mardaites in repelling the Arab army. The Mardaites were mountaineers from the Taurus that Emperor Constantine IV recruited to infiltrate Lebanon and join the Maronites to carry attacks against the Arab invaders. The resistance movement became known as Marada, meaning rebels.

In 685 AD, the Maronites appointed a Patriarch for themselves, St. John Maron, who became the first Patriarch on the Maronite Church. The appointing of a Patriarch made the Byzantine Emperor furious, which led to the persecution of the Maronites by the Byzantines. 

In 694 AD, Emperor Justinian II sent an army to attack the Maronites, destroying their monastery in the Orontes valley and killing 500 monks. The Maronites followed up by leading their army against the Byzantines at Amioun and defeated the Byzantine army in a crushing victory that cost Constantinople two of its best generals. Following the Byzantine persecutions in the Orontes valley, many Aramean Maronite monks left their lands in the Orontes valley and joined the Phoenician Maronites in the mountains of Lebanon. The Maronite Church began to grow then in the valleys of Lebanon.

The Maronites managed then to become "civilly semiautonomous" where they settled and kept speaking Western Aramaic in daily life and Syriac language for their liturgy. The Christians that chose to remain in the newly Arab-controlled areas and inhabited by the Arab invaders gradually became a minority and many of those converted to Islam in order to escape taxation and to further their own political and professional advancement.

For the next 300 years, the Maronites raided and retreated within the region keeping their Christian faith. In 936, the monastery of Beth Moroon (funded by the Byzantine emperor Marcian in Saint Maroun's honour) and a few other monasteries were completely destroyed by the Arabs who attacked the Maronites on religious grounds. Aside from this they were isolated from most of the world for much of the end of the millennium.

The Maronites welcomed the conquering Christians of the First Crusade in 1096 AD. Around the late 12th century, according to William of Tyre, the Maronites numbered 40,000 people. During the several centuries of separation from the rest of the Christian world, they often claim to have been in full  communion with the Catholic Church throughout. Despite this the majority of the accounts of those interacting with them at the time indicate that they were monothelites; notable figures from the era such as the medieval historian Jacques de Vitry and the chronicler of the Pope, William of Tyre affirming this, the latter of which (William Tyre) recorded both their kindness upon receiving him and the monothelitic views of which they recanted, stating; "The heresy of Maro and his followers is and was that in our Lord Jesus Christ, there exists and did exist from the beginning one will and one energy only, as may be learned from the sixth council, which as is well known, was assembled against them and in which they suffered sentence of condemnation. Now however...they repented all of these heresies and returned to the catholic church". The Maronites have also had a presence in Cyprus since the early 9th century and many Maronites went there following the Sultan Saladin's successful Siege of Jerusalem in 1187 AD.

During the papacy of Pope Gregory XIII (1572-1585), steps were taken to bring the Maronites still closer to Rome. The Maronite College in Rome (Pontificio Collegio dei Maroniti) being founded by Gregory XIII in 1584. By the 17th century, the Maronites had developed a strong natural liking for Europe – particularly France.

The relationship between the Druze and Christians has been characterized by harmony and peaceful coexistence, with amicable relations between the two groups prevailing throughout history, with the exception of some periods, including 1860 Mount Lebanon civil war. In the 19th century, thousands of Maronites were massacred by the Lebanese Druze during the 1860 conflict. According to some estimates about 11,000 Lebanese Christians (including Maronites) were killed; over 4,000 died from hunger and disease as a result of the war.

After the 1860 massacres, many Maronites fled to Egypt. Antonios Bachaalany, a Maronite from Salima (Baabda district) was the first emigrant to the New World, where he reached the United States in 1854 and died there two years later.

Population

Lebanon

According to the Maronite church, there were approximately 1,062,000 Maronites in Lebanon in 1994, where they constitute up to 32% of the population. Under the terms of the National Pact agreement between the various political and religious leaders of Lebanon, the president of the country must be a Maronite Christian.

Syria
There is also a small Maronite Christian community in Syria. In 2017, the Annuario Pontificio reported that 3,300 people belonged to the Archeparchy of Aleppo, 15,000 in the Archeparchy of Damascus and 45,000 in the Eparchy of Lattaquié). In 2015, the BBC placed the number of Maronites in Syria at between 28,000 and 60,000.

Cyprus

Maronites first migrated to Cyprus in the 8th century, and there are approximately 5,800 Maronites on the island today, the vast majority in the Republic of Cyprus. The community historically spoke Cypriot Maronite Arabic, but today Cypriot Maronites speak the Greek language, with the Cypriot government designating Cypriot Maronite Arabic as a dialect.

Israel

A Maronite community of about 11,000 people lives in Israel. The 2017 Annuario Pontificio reported that 10,000 people belonged to the Maronite Catholic Archeparchy of Haifa and the Holy Land and 504 people belonged to the Exarchate of Jerusalem and Palestine.

Diaspora

According to the Encyclopedia of the Peoples of Africa and the Middle East, "accurate figures are not available, but it is probable that the Maronite diaspora of over 2 million individuals is about two times larger" than the Maronite population living in their historic homelands in Lebanon, Syria, and Israel.

According to the Annuario Pontificio, in 2017 the Eparchy of San Charbel in Buenos Aires, Argentina, has 750,000 members; the Eparchy of Our Lady of Lebanon of São Paulo, Brazil, had 501,000 members; the Eparchy of Saint Maron of Sydney, Australia, had 152,300 members; the Eparchy of Saint Maron of Montreal, Canada, had 89,775 members; the Eparchy of Our Lady of the Martyrs of Lebanon in Mexico had 159,403 members; the Eparchy of Our Lady of Lebanon of Los Angeles in the United States had 46,000 members; and the Eparchy of Saint Maron of Brooklyn in the United States had 33,000 members.

According to the Annuario Pontificio, 50,944 people belonged to the Maronite Catholic Eparchy of Our Lady of Lebanon of Paris in 2017. In Europe, some Belgian Maronites are involved in the trade of diamonds in the diamond district of Antwerp.

According to the Annuario Pontificio, 66,495 belonged to the Apostolic Exarchate of West and Central Africa (Nigeria) in 2017.

Role in politics

Lebanon
With only two exceptions, all Lebanese presidents have been Maronites as part of a tradition that persists as part of the National Pact, by which the Prime Minister has historically been a Sunni Muslim and the Speaker of the National Assembly has historically been a Shia Muslim.

Israel
People born into Christian families or clans who have either Aramaic or Maronite cultural heritage are considered an ethnicity separate from Israeli Arabs and since 2014 can register themselves as Arameans. The Christians who have applied so far for recognition as Aramean are mostly Galilean Maronites, who trace their culture, ancestry and language to an Aramaic-speaking, pre-Arab population of the Levant.

In addition, some 500 Christian adherents of the Syriac Catholic Church in Israel are expected to apply for the recreated ethnic status, as well as several hundred Aramaic-speaking adherents of the Syriac Orthodox Church. Though supported by Gabriel Naddaf, the move was condemned by the Greek Orthodox Patriarchate, which described it as "an attempt to divide the Palestinian minority in Israel".

This recognition comes after about seven years of activity by the Aramean Christian Foundation in Israel, led by IDF Major Shadi Khalloul Risho and the Israeli Christian Recruitment Forum, headed by Father Gabriel Naddaf of the Greek-Orthodox Church and Major Ihab Shlayan. Shadi Khalloul Risho is also a member of the Israeli right-wing Yisrael Beiteinu party, and was placed 15th in the 2015 parliamentary elections in the party's member list; the party however received only 5 seats.

Identity
The followers of the Maronite Church form a part of the Syriac Christians and belong to the West Syriac Rite. The Maronite Syriac Church of Antioch traces its foundation to Maron, an early 4th-century Syriac monk venerated as a saint. Before the conquest by Arabian Muslims reached Lebanon, the Lebanese people, including those who would become Muslim and the majority who would remain Christian, spoke a dialect of Aramaic called Syriac. Syriac remains the liturgical language of the Maronite Church.

Phoenicianism

Phoenicianism is an identity on the part of Lebanese Christians that has developed into an integrated ideology led by key thinkers, but there are a few who have stood out more than others: Charles Corm, Michel Chiha, and Said Aql in their promotion of Phoenicianism. In post civil-war Lebanon since the Taif agreement, politically Phoenicianism is restricted to a small group.

Among leaders of the movement, Etienne Saqr, Said Akl, Charles Malik, Camille Chamoun, and Bachir Gemayel have been notable names, some going as far as voicing anti-Arab views. In his book the Israeli writer Mordechai Nisan, who at times met with some of them during the war, quoted Said Akl, a famous Lebanese poet and philosopher, as saying; "I would cut off my right hand, and not associate myself to an Arab." Akl believes in emphasizing the Phoenician legacy of the Lebanese people and has promoted the use of the Lebanese dialect written in a modified Latin alphabet, rather than the Arabic one, although both alphabets have descended from the Phoenician alphabet.

In opposition to such views, Arabism was affirmed at the March 1936 Congress of the Coast and Four Districts, when the Muslim leadership at the conference made the declaration that Lebanon was an Arab country, indistinguishable from its Arab neighbors. In the April 1936 Beirut municipal elections, Christian and Muslim politicians were divided along Phoenician and Arab lines in the matter of whether the Lebanese coast should be claimed by Syria or given to Lebanon, increasing the already mounting tensions between the two communities. Phoenicianism is still disputed by many Arabist scholars who have on occasion tried to convince its adherents to abandon their claims as false, and to embrace and accept the Arab identity instead. This conflict of ideas of identity is believed to be one of the pivotal disputes between the Muslim and Christian populations of Lebanon and what mainly divides the country to the detriment of national unity.

In general it appears that Muslims focus more on the Arab identity of the Lebanese history and culture whereas the Christian communities–especially the Maronites, focus on their history and struggles as an ethnoreligious group as distinct from Arab identity and the Arab world, while also reaffirming the Lebanese identity, as well as refraining from Arab characterization as it would deny them their striving achievement of having fended off the Arabs and Turks physically, culturally, and spiritually since their conception. The Maronite perseverance led to their existence even to today.

Support of Lebanese identity

Lebanese Maronites are known to be specifically linked to the root of Lebanese Nationalism and opposition to Pan-Arabism in Lebanon, this being the case during 1958 Lebanon crisis. Muslim Arab nationalists backed by Gamel Abdel Nasser tried to overthrow the then Maronite dominated government in power, due to displeasure at the government's pro-western policies and their lack of commitment and duty to the so-called "Arab brotherhood" by preferring to keep Lebanon away from the Arab League and the political confrontations of the Middle East. A more hard-nosed nationalism among some Maronites leaders, who saw Lebanese nationalism more in terms of its confessional roots and failed to be carried away by Chiha's vision, clung to a more security-minded view of Lebanon. They regarded the national project as mainly a program for the security of Maronites and a bulwark against threats from Muslims and their hinterland.

The right-wing yet secular Guardians of the Cedars, with its exiled Leader and founder Etienne Saqr (also the father of singers Karol Sakr and Pascale Sakr) took no sectarian stance and even had Muslim members who joined in their radical stance against Arabism and Palestinian forces in Lebanon. Saqr summarized his party's view on Arab Identity in their official ideological manifesto by stating;

On an Al Jazeera special dedicated to the political Christian clans of Lebanon and their struggle for power in the 2009 election entitled, "Lebanon: The Family Business", the issue of identity was brought up on several occasions, by various politicians including Druze leader Walid Jumblatt, who claimed that all Lebanese lack somewhat of a real identity and the country is yet to discover one everybody could agree on. Sami Gemayel, of the Gemayel clan and son of former president Amin Gemayel, stated he did not consider himself an Arab but instead identified himself as a Syriac Christian, going on to explain that to him and many Lebanese the "acceptance" of Lebanon's "Arab identity" according to the Taef Agreement wasn't something that they "accepted" but instead were forced into signing through pressure.

In a speech in 2009 to a crowd of Christian Kataeb supporters Gemayel declared that he felt there was importance in Christians in Lebanon finding an identity and went on to state what he finds identification with as a Lebanese Christian, concluding with a purposeful exclusion of Arabism in the segment. The speech met with applause afterward from the audience;

Etienne Sakr, of the Guardians of the Cedars Lebanese party, in an interview responded "We are not Arabs" to an interview question about the Guardians of the Cedars' ideology of Lebanon being Lebanese. He continued by talking about how describing Lebanon as being not Arab was a crime in present-day Lebanon, about the Lebanese Civil War, and about Arabism as being a first step towards Islamism, claiming that "the Arabs want to annex Lebanon" and in order to do this "to push the Christians out (of Lebanon)", this being "the plan since 1975", among other issues.

On 16 December 2022, at the Syriac Orthodox Patriarchal Residence in Atchaneh, Lebanon, the Syriac Orthodox Patriarch, Ignatius Aphrem II issued a joint statement with the Maronite Patriarch, Bechara Boutros al-Rahi, the Syriac Catholic Patriarch, Ignatius Joseph III Yonan, the Chaldean Patriarch, Louis Raphaël I Sako and the Assyrian Patriarch of the Church of the East, Awa III proclaiming:

Embrace of Arab identity
During a final session of the Lebanese Parliament, a Marada Maronite MP stated his identity as an Arab: "I, the Maronite Christian Lebanese Arab, grandson of Patriarch Estefan Doueihy, declare my pride to be a part of our people’s resistance in the South. Can one renounce what guarantees his rights?"
 	
Maronite Deacon Soubhi Makhoul, administrator for the Maronite Exarchate in Jerusalem, has said "The Maronites are Arabs, we are part of the Arab world. And although it’s important to revive our language and maintain our heritage, the church is very outspoken against the campaign of these people.”

Aramean identity 
Many Maronites consider themselves the descendants of Arameans who lived in the Levant. Furthermore they identify the founder of the church, Saint Maron as a Syriac-speaking hermit of Aramean origins.

In 2014, Israel recognize the Aramean community within its borders as a national minority, allowing some of the Christians in Israel to be registered as "Aramean", instead of "Arab" or "Unclassified". The Christians, who may apply for recognition as Aramean, are mostly Galilean Maronites, who trace their culture, ancestry and language to Arameans.

Religion

The Maronites belong to the Maronite Syriac Church of Antioch (a former ancient Greek city now in Hatay Province, Turkey) and are an Eastern Catholic Syriac Church, using the Antiochian Rite, that had returned to its communion with Rome  since 1180 A.D., although the official view of the Contemporary Maronite Church is that it had never accepted either the Monophysitic views held by their Syriac neighbours, which were condemned in the Council of Chalcedon, or the failed compromise doctrine of Monothelitism (despite overwhelming evidence to the contrary of the latter claim being found in contemporary and medieval sources, with evidence that they were staunchly Monothelites for several centuries, beginning in the early 7th century after their rejection of the sixth ecumenical council). The Maronite Patriarch is traditionally seated in Bkerke north of Beirut.

Names
Modern Maronites often adopt French or other Western European given names (with biblical origins) for their children, including Michel, Marc, Marie, Georges, Carole, Charles, Antoine, Joseph, Pierre, Christian, Christelle and Rodrigue. Other common names are strictly Christian and are Aramaic, or Arabic, forms of biblical, Hebrew, or Greek Christian names, such as Antun (Anthony or Antonios), Butros (Peter), Boulos (Paul), Semaan or Shamaoun (Simon or Simeon), Jergyes (George), Elie (Ilyas or Elias), Iskander (Alexander), Hannah, Katrina (Catherine) and Beshara (literally Good News in reference to the Gospel). Other common names are Sarkis (Sergius) and Bakhos (Bacchus), while others are common both among Christians and Muslims, such as Youssef (Joseph), Ibrahim (Abraham), and Maryam (Mary).

Some Maronite Christians are named in honour of Maronite saints, including the Aramaic names Maro(u)n (after their patron saint Maron), Nimtullah, Charbel or Sharbel after Saint Charbel Makhluf and Rafqa (Rebecca).

Persecution and struggle
Maronites were persecuted historically and continuously during the period of Arab conquests of the Middle East (Mount Lebanon) and under the rule of the Ottoman Empire. The Great Famine of Mount Lebanon, which occurred between 1915 and 1918, was caused by multiple factors; one was the Ottoman policy of acquiring all food products in the region to be used for the Ottoman army and administration, and barring food from being sent to the Maronite Christian population of Mount Lebanon, effectively condemning them to starvation.  The death of 200,000 Maronite Christians and other people of Mount Lebanon was mainly due to starvation and disease. It was suggested at the time that the starvation of the Maronites was an Ottoman policy aimed at destroying the Maronites, in keeping with the treatment of Armenians, Assyrians and Greeks.

Maronite Christians felt a sense of alienation, exclusion, and targeting as a result of Pan-Arabism and Islamism in Lebanon. Among the historic attacks on the community was the Damour massacre by the PLO. Until recently, the Cypriot Maronites battled to preserve their ancestral language. The Maronite monks maintain that Lebanon is synonymous with Maronite history and ethos; that its Maronitism antedates the Arab conquest of Lebanon and that Arabism is only a historical accident. The Maronites experienced mass persecution under the Ottoman Turks, who massacred and mistreated Maronites for their faith, disallowing them from owning horses and forcing them to wear only black clothing. The Ottoman Empire's WW1 policies, in combination with the Allied Forces' naval blockade, resulted in the death of hundreds of thousands of Maronites of Mount Lebanon, with total fatalities estimated between 100-300 thousand people that died from malnutrition, disease and starvation. The Lebanese Druze also persecuted the Maronites, and massacred in excess of 20,000 of them in the mid-1800s. However, agreements have been held with the Druze. Moreover, the Maronites later emerged as the most dominant group in Lebanon, a status they held until the sectarian conflict that resulted in the Lebanese Civil War.

See also

Christianity in Lebanon
List of Maronites
Marounistan
Maronite Christianity in Lebanon
Maronite flag
Maronites in Israel
Syriac Christianity

References

External links

The Syriac Maronites

 
Semitic-speaking peoples
Christian groups in the Middle East
History of Eastern Catholicism
Ethnic groups in Lebanon
Ethnic groups in the Middle East
Ethnoreligious groups